New Jersey Drive, Vol. 2 (Original Motion Picture Soundtrack) is the second of two soundtracks to Nick Gomez' 1995 film New Jersey Drive. It was released on April 11, 1995 through Tommy Boy Records, and consists of hip hop music. Composed of eight songs, the album features performances by Biz Markie, Boot Camp Clik, E Bros, Flip Squad All-Stars, Jeru the Damaja, Mad Lion, Naughty by Nature, O.C. and Organized Konfusion. Production was handled by Da Beatminerz, DJ Premier, Funkmaster Flex, Knobody, KRS-One, Marley Marl and Roc Raida. 

This soundtrack failed to match the success of the gold-selling Volume 1, but it still managed to make it to #58 on the Billboard 200 and #9 on the Top R&B/Hip-Hop Albums.

Track listing

Chart history

References

External links

Sequel albums
1995 soundtrack albums
Hip hop soundtracks
Tommy Boy Records soundtracks
Albums produced by KRS-One
Albums produced by DJ Premier
Albums produced by Marley Marl
Albums produced by Da Beatminerz
Drama film soundtracks
Crime film soundtracks